The R603 road is a regional road in County Cork, Ireland. It travels from the R586 at Bandon Bridge in Bandon south to the R600 at Garranereagh, via Kilbrittain. In Bandon, the route is split on joining and leaving the N71 road.

References

Regional roads in the Republic of Ireland
Roads in County Cork